Bahrain participated at the 16th Asian Games in Guangzhou, China.

Medalists

Athletics

Men
Track and road events

Field events

Women
Track and road events

Cycling

Road cycling

Men

Football

Men

Mohamed Ajaj
Mohamed Al Banna
Mahmood Alajmi
Abdulla Alhazaa
Rashed Alhooti
Abdulwahab Almalood
Saad Alromaihi
Abdulwahab Alsafi
Mahmood Ayyad
Mohamed Harban
Sayed Hashem
Ebrahim Shawqi Isa
Ismaeel Khamis
Ebrahim Lutfalla
Mohamed Mahorfi
Ahmed Mushaima
Hesham Nayem
Mohamed Jaadar Sahman
Tareq Showaitezr
Sayed Dhiya Shubbar

Men's team will participate in Group B of the football tournament.

Group B

Handball

Men

Salah Abduljalil Jasim Abbas
Hasan Shehab Ahmed Alfardan
Ali Merza Salman Abdulla Ali
Mohamed Husain Abdulla Ali
Ali Zuhair Isa Abdulla Ali
Sadiq Ali Abdulla Mohamed Ali
Husain Ali Hassan Ebrahim Alsayyad
Mahmood Mansoor Ahmed Alwanna
Ali Husain Abdulredha Husain
Ahmed Abbas Abdulla Yusuf Jasim
Saeed Jasim Mohamed Jawher
Hasan Mohamed Ali Hasan Madan
Abbas Habib Mohamed Ali Malalla
Jaafar Abbas Abdulkarim Mohamed
Jaafer Abdulqader Ali Daw Salman
Maher AshoorIsa Yahya Yahya

Men's team will participate in Group B of the handball tournament.

Group B

Placement 5th–6th

Judo

Men

Sailing

Men

Open

Shooting

Men

Women

Swimming

Men

Women

Taekwondo

Men

Women

Nations at the 2010 Asian Games
2010
2010 in Bahraini sport